The 35th Writers Guild of America Awards honored the best television, and film writers of 1982. Winners were announced in 1983.

Winners & Nominees

Film 
Winners are listed first highlighted in boldface.

Television

Special Awards

References

External links 

 WGA.org

1982
W
Writers Guild of America Awards
Writers Guild of America Awards
Writers Guild of America Awards